Olivier is an unincorporated community in Iberia Parish, Louisiana, United States.

Etymology
Olivier is named for Pierre-François Olivier de Vézin (April 28, 1707 – April 20, 1776) and occupies part of the Bayou Teche's delta ecosystem.

References

Populated places in Iberia Parish, Louisiana
Unincorporated communities in Iberia Parish, Louisiana
Unincorporated communities in Louisiana